Hujialou station is an interchange station on Line 6 and Line 10 of the Beijing Subway. The station handled a peak passenger traffic of 206,800 people on May 5, 2013.

Station layout 
The line 6 station has 2 underground side platforms. The line 10 station has an underground split island platform.

Exits 
There are 6 exits, lettered B, C, D, E, G, and H. Exits C and E are accessible.

References

External links
 

Beijing Subway stations in Chaoyang District
Railway stations in China opened in 2008